The Torrey Log Church–Schoolhouse was built in Torrey, Utah in 1898 as a LDS meetinghouse and schoolhouse. The one story log structure served as the  school until 1917, and as a meetinghouse until 1928.

The interior is a single room with an entrance on the south side and windows on the east and west sides. The windows have pedimented heads, an unusual detail in a log structure, and show a Greek Revival influence. The shingled hip roof displays a pronounced flare at the eaves and features a bell tower over the front door. The interior space is open to the rafters and is sheathed with beaded planking. Metal tie rods prevent the walls from spreading.

The building continued to be used as a meeting place for the local Daughters of Utah Pioneers chapter until the 1970s. After an abortive project in the 1980s to renovate the building as an information station, the building was given to the DUP on the condition that it be moved off the LDS church property.  It was moved in 1991 to a temporary location, with the intention of constructing a foundation and basement. It has since been fully restored.

It was a one-room schoolhouse.

See also
 
 National Register of Historic Places listings in Wayne County, Utah

References

External links

  at the National Park Service's NRHP database prior to restoration

19th-century Latter Day Saint church buildings
Defunct schools in Utah
Former churches in Utah
Former Latter Day Saint religious buildings and structures
Meetinghouses of the Church of Jesus Christ of Latter-day Saints in Utah
One-room schoolhouses in Utah
Churches on the National Register of Historic Places in Utah
Religious buildings and structures completed in 1898
Rustic architecture in Utah
School buildings on the National Register of Historic Places in Utah
1898 establishments in Utah
National Register of Historic Places in Wayne County, Utah
Relocated buildings and structures in Utah